Mondovì is a town and comune (township) in Piedmont, northern Italy, about  from Turin. The area around it is known as the Monregalese.

The town, located on the Monte Regale hill, is divided into several rioni (ancient quarters): Piazza (the most ancient), Breo, Pian della Valle, Carassone, Altipiano, Borgato and Rinchiuso, lower, next to the Ellero stream, developed from the 18th century when industries developed in Mondovì and when it was reached by the railway.

The Funicolare di Mondovì, a funicular railway reopened in 2006, links Breo with Piazza.

It is the seat of the Roman Catholic Diocese of Mondovì.

History

Founded on a hilltop in 1198 by survivors of the destroyed village of Bredolo and by inhabitants of the neighboring villages of Vico (now Vicoforte), Vasco (now Monastero di Vasco) and Carassone (which was abandoned after the founding of the new city): an independent comune named Ël Mont ëd Vi, meaning "The Mount of Vico" in Piedmontese, was formed.

Their independence proved to be short-lived because the bishop of Asti and the marquis of Ceva stormed it in 1200 and destroyed it in 1231. The commune resisted, however, and the following year it was able to sustain another attack from Asti. In 1260 it was occupied by Charles I of Anjou (then King of Naples and one of the most powerful landlords in Provence and north-western Italy), while in 1274 it returned under the bishops of Asti. In 1290 he was however able to buy back its communal independence, under the new name of Mons Regalis ("Royal Mount") due to its large privileges. In 1305 it fell again under the Angevins, followed by the Visconti, the Marquisate of Montferrat, the Acaja and, from 1418, the House of Savoy.

Mondovì continued to grow until the 16th century when it was the largest city in Piedmont. In 1537 it was occupied by France, under which it mostly remained until 1559. In 1560, Emmanuel Philibert, Duke of Savoy restored it to Piedmont, which held it until the Italian unification, apart from the Napoleonic period (1796–1814).

Piedmont's first printing press was created in Mondovì in 1472. From 1560 to 1566, Mondovì was the seat of Piedmont's first university.

Music 

It is home of the Academia Montis Regalis orchestra led by conductor Alessandro De Marchi.

Main sights
 Church of San Francesco Saverio (1664–1678), with works by Andrea Pozzo.
 Cathedral of San Donato, designed by Francesco Gallo.
 Santa Croce Chapel, with a Gothic fresco cycle.
 Medieval walls and towers (12th century).
 Piazza Maggiore (Main Square, 14th-16th century), in Gothic style .
 Church of Santa Chiara.
 Church of the Misericordia (1708–1717), designed by Francesco Gallo.
 Convent of Nostra Donna.
 Palazzo Fauzone.
 Chapel of San Rocco delle Carceri.
 Chapel of San Borgato delle Forche, with notable Gothic paintings.

Nearby is the Baroque sanctuary of Vicoforte.

Gallery

People
Mondovì is the birthplace of
 Giovanni Battista Beccaria (1716–1781), physicist
 Teresa De Giuli Borsi (1817–1877), opera singer 
 Francesco Canaveri (1753-1836), physician, anatomist, and professor 
 Giovanni Giolitti (1842–1928), five-time Prime Minister of Italy
 Francis Vigo (1747–1836), fur trader, American Revolutionary War hero
 Michele Baranowicz (b. 1989), volleyball player
 Giovanni Bertone (1884–1972), automobile designer

See also
Roman Catholic Diocese of Mondovì

References

External links

 Official website

1198 establishments in Europe
12th-century establishments in Italy
Populated places established in the 12th century